Bassetts Manor is a Grade II-listed building in Hartfield, East Sussex, England.

Location
The manor is located North of the village of Hartfield, in Withyham, East Sussex.

History
The two-storey manor was built in the 16th century. The front door dates back to the early 17th century. The property includes eighteen workshops, three cottages, and three stables. 

In 1969, the manor was purchased by the Whetstone family. In 1986, it was used as a beef-raising farm.

Heritage significance
It has been listed as a Grade II building by English Heritage since 26 November 1953.

References

Grade II listed buildings in East Sussex
Hartfield